Susanna Hanan (née Murray; 1 July 1870 – 12 February 1970) was a New Zealand governess, singer and community worker. She was born in Wallacetown, Southland, New Zealand, on 1 July 1870. She was the wife of Josiah Hanan and the aunt of Ralph Hanan.

References

1870 births
1970 deaths
New Zealand social workers
New Zealand governesses
People from Southland, New Zealand
20th-century New Zealand educators
20th-century women educators